Tranes is a genus of true weevils in the beetle family Curculionidae. There are about 11 described species in Tranes.

Species
These 11 species belong to the genus Tranes:
 Tranes insignipes Lea, 1929
 Tranes insularis Pascoe & F.P., 1874
 Tranes internatus Pascoe, 1870 (macrozamia borer)
 Tranes lyterioides Pascoe & F.P., 1875
 Tranes monopticus Pascoe & F.P., 1870
 Tranes prosternalis Lea, 1929
 Tranes roei Pascoe & F.P., 1929
 Tranes sparsus Boheman, 1843
 Tranes subopacus Lea, 1929
 Tranes vigorsii Boheman, 1843
 Tranes xanthorrhoeae Lea & A.M., 1898

References

Further reading

 
 
 

Molytinae
Articles created by Qbugbot